Chelsea Snow Cain (born 1972) is an American writer of novels and columns.

Biography
Cain was born February 5, 1972, in Iowa City, Iowa, to Mary Cain and Larry Schmidt. Cain spent her early childhood on a hippie commune outside of Iowa City.  Her father dodged the Vietnam draft and her parents lived "underground" for several years. In 1978, she moved with her mother to Bellingham, Washington, where she attended Lowell Elementary School, Fairhaven Middle School, and Sehome High School.  She spent the school year in Bellingham with her mother and the summers in Florida with her father and stepmother and stepbrother.

Cain left Bellingham after high school to study political science at the University of California, Irvine, where she wrote for the New University newspaper and became the opinion editor.  After graduating in 1994, she attended the graduate school of journalism at the University of Iowa.

While at Iowa, she wrote a weekly column for The Daily Iowan.  Her master's thesis at the University of Iowa became Dharma Girl, a memoir about Cain's early childhood on the hippie commune.  One of her professors presented it to several editors for review, and Seal Press picked it up as Cain's first published work. She was 24 years old.

She traveled across the United States on book tour with Dharma Girl, living for a brief period in Portland, Oregon, and then in New York City.  After a year in New York, she returned to Portland, and edited an anthology for Seal Press titled Wild Child: Girlhoods in the Counterculture.

Cain is married to Marc Mohan, a video store owner and film reviewer for The Oregonian. They have one daughter, Eliza.

Cain and her family currently reside in Portland, Oregon.

Career
After working as a creative director at a public relations firm in Portland for several years, Cain began writing humor books in her spare time, including The Hippie Handbook: How to Tie-Dye a T-Shirt, Flash a Peace Sign, and Other Essential Skills for the Carefree Life (Chronicle Books, 2004), Confessions of a Teen Sleuth (Bloomsbury, 2005), and Does this Cape Make Me Look Fat? Pop-Psychology for Superheroes (Chronicle Books, 2006), which Cain co-wrote with her husband.  Cain also composed a weekly column for Portland's alternative newspaper, The Portland Mercury and started contributing to Portland's major daily, The Oregonian in 2003. when she left marketing behind to focus on writing full-time.  Her last column with The Oregonian was posted on December 28, 2008.

She wrote her first thriller Heartsick in 2004, while pregnant with her daughter. It was published on September 4, 2007. Sweetheart and Evil at Heart followed as the second and third in the series, respectively.

In March 2016, Cain started writing a new Marvel Comics series, Mockingbird, the first solo series about the character.  The series ran for eight issues before cancellation.

She is the writer of comic book series Man-Eaters for Image Comics with artists Kate Niemczyk and Lia Miternique, which became available in shops in September 2018 and ended in October 2019. Man-Eaters was criticized for failing to account for trans experiences as the plot revolves around a disease that impacts people based on sex-specific symptoms. Cain's response was to print tweets criticizing her in subsequent issues of the book, which resulted in harassment and threats being aimed at her critics, and called into question the legality of publishing tweets. She went on to ask for volunteers to do sensitivity reading, as she stated the book was expensive to produce and she could not offer any pay for the job. Despite this widespread criticism, Cain returned to Image to publish Man-Eaters: Tomorrow Belongs to You! in March 2020 and an additional five issue miniseries called Man-Eaters: The Cursed in July 2021.

Accolades
 Named 6th best book of the year (2008) by Stephen King in Entertainment Weekly for Heartsick and Sweetheart
 Amazon Mystery/Thriller of 2007 for Heartsick
 Named one of Four Hot Authors for Fall 2007 by Entertainment Weekly
 Heartsick optioned as a film in September 2007
 Booksense 76 Pick for Heartsick
 Barnes & Noble Developing Writer pick for Heartsick
 New York Times Book Review editor's choice for Heartsick and Confessions of a Teen Sleuth: A Parody

Bibliography
 Dharma Girl (1996)
 Wild Child: Girlhoods in the Counterculture (1999)
 The Hippie Handbook: How to Tie-Dye a T-Shirt, Flash a Peace Sign, and Other Essential Skills for the Carefree Life (2004)
 Confessions of a Teen Sleuth: A Parody (2005)
 Does This Cape Make Me Look Fat? Pop-Psychology for Super Heroes (2006)
Mockingbird – S.H.I.E.L.D. 50th Anniversary #1 (2015)
Mockingbird #1–8 (2016)

Gretchen Lowell Series
 Heartsick (2007)
 Sweetheart (2008)
 Evil At Heart (2009)
 The Night Season (2011)
 Kill You Twice (August 2012)
 Let Me Go (August 2013)

Kick Lannigan Series
 One Kick (August 2014)
 Kick Back (unpublished)

References

External links

 

1972 births
Living people
Writers from Iowa City, Iowa
University of California, Irvine alumni
Novelists from Oregon
The Oregonian people
American women novelists
21st-century American novelists
American columnists
American women columnists
21st-century American memoirists
American women memoirists
21st-century American women writers
American comics writers
Novelists from Iowa
Female comics writers
American parodists
Parody novelists
Marvel Comics writers
Marvel Comics people